Abraão Vicente (born 26 February 1980) is Cape Verdean politician currently serving as both Minister of Culture and Creative Industries and Minister of the Sea. Vicente is a sociologist, painter and self-taught photographer.

Early life and education 
Vicente was born in Assomada, Santiago Island and studied for his first degree in Sociology at the New University of Lisbon (Universidade Nova de Lisboa) Portugal.

Career 
He began a career in journalism at A Nação newspaper in 2008 and rose through the ranks to the position of editor before leaving the paper in 2010. From 2006 to 2008 he presented House of Culture program on National Television of Cape Verde (TCV) and 180 Degrees from 2008 to 2009 on same channel. He is painter and a self-taught photographer and participated in exhibitions in foreign countries with his arts in private collections. He is currently serving as the Minister of Culture and Creative Industries (2016- ) and also Minister of the Sea (2021- ).

References 

Living people
1980 births
Cape Verdean politicians
NOVA University Lisbon alumni